Chief Clarion Chukwura (born Clara Nneka Oluwatoyin Folashade Chukwurah; 24 July 1964) is a Nigerian actress  and humanitarian.

Career
She had her nursery and primary school in Lagos and later pursued her secondary education at the Queen of the Rosary College, Onitsha then proceeded to study Acting and Speech at the Department of Dramatic Arts of Obafemi Awolowo University.
She was recognized as a United Nations Peace Ambassador for her charity work across Africa. she began her career in acting in 1980 but became popular when she featured in a soap opera titled "mirror in the Sun". She was the first Nigerian to win the Best Actress category at the 1982 FESPACO film festival in Burkina Faso.

Personal life
Chukwura was born as the only daughter in a family of four on 24 July 1964. She is the mother of music video director Clarence Peters. She is from Anambra State. In 2016, Chukwura married for the third time Anthony Boyd, and converted to her new husband's Jehovah's Witnesses faith.

Television
Bello's Way (1984)
Mirror in the Sun (1984)
Ripples (1989)
Super Story (2001)
Delilah (2016)

Filmography
Fiery Force (1986)
Money Power (1982)
Farewell to Babylon (1979)
Yemoja
Apaye
 Glamour Girls 2
remarkable night
igbotic love
forbidden choice
caught in the act.
Abuja Connection
Egg of Life

Recognition
 The traditional title of Ada Eji Eje Mba I of Onitsha, Anambra State
Legends of Nollywood award at the Nollywood at 20 Celebration
1982 Best Actress of the Year at All Africa Film Festival, Ougadagodou, Burkina Faso (won)
1997 Afro-Hollywood Best Actress Award for Glamour Girls (won)  
2001 THEMA Best supporting actress (yoruba) award (won)
2001 Lebatino Film Festival, Mexico award for best actress (won)
2001 THEMA Best supporting actress  (won)
2004 Reel Award for Best Actress (won)
2014 Africa Movie Academy Awards for Best Actress in a Leading Role
2019 Gathering of Africa’s Best Awards (GAB Awards) - Special Recognition Award in the Arts

References

Nigerian Jehovah's Witnesses
Nigerian film actresses
1964 births
Living people
Best Actress Africa Movie Academy Award winners
Actresses from Lagos
Obafemi Awolowo University alumni
Actresses in Yoruba cinema
Nigerian humanitarians
20th-century Nigerian actresses
21st-century Nigerian actresses
Nigerian television actresses
Converts to Jehovah's Witnesses
Igbo actresses
People from Anambra State